In mathematics, Boehmians are objects obtained by an abstract algebraic construction of "quotients of sequences." The original construction was motivated by regular operators introduced by T. K. Boehme. The original construction of Boehmians gives us a space of generalized functions that includes all regular operators and has the algebraic character of convolution quotients.

It was also applied to function spaces on other domains, like locally compact groups and  manifolds.

The general construction of Boehmians 

Let  be a collection of sequences of elements of  such that the following two conditions are satisfied:

(1) If , then ,

Now we define a set of pairs of sequences:

.

In  we introduce an equivalence relation:

 ~  if .

References 
 J. Mikusiński, Operational Calculus, Pergamon Press (1959).
 T. K. Boehme, The support of Mikusiński operators, Trans. Amer. Math. Soc. 176 (1973), 319–334.
 J. Mikusiński and P. Mikusiński, Quotients de suites et leurs applications dans l'analyse fonctionnelle (French), [Quotients of sequences and their applications in functional analysis], C. R. Acad. Sci. Paris Sr. I Math. 293 (1981), 463-464.
 P. Mikusiński, Convergence of Boehmians, Japan. J. Math. (N.S.) 9 (1983), 159–179.

Generalized functions